Jimmy Valoyes Cordoba (born 8 June 1984) is a Colombian professional footballer who plays for Sport Huancayo.

Club career

Ciclón del Golfo
In 2012, Valoyes signed with Ciclón del Golfo of El Salvador.

Dragón 
In 2013, Valoyes signed with Dragón. In the Clausura 2014, Dragón finished in the fourth position of the league table with 25 points and classified for the semi-finals of that tournament. In the first leg of the semi-finals, Valoyes scored a crucial goal against FAS at the Estadio Juan Francisco Barraza in a 1–0 victory. In the second leg, Dragón got a 0-0 draw, reaching the final.

Unfortunately, Dragon was defeated in the final by Isidro Metapán on penalties.

Águila 
Valoyes signed with Águila for the Apertura 2015. With the team of San Miguel reached the Clausura 2016 final, but they were defeated by local rivals Dragón 0–1 in the Estadio Cuscatlán.

In February 2016, Valoyes reached 100 games in Salvadoran football in a match against FAS.

Cortuluá 
In June 2017, it was announced that Valoyes signed with Cortuluá even without having rescinded his current contract with Águila before the start of the Apertura 2017. This controversy was solved days later.

Deportivo Pasto 
In January 2018, Valoyes signed with Deportivo Pasto.

Return to Águila 
Valoyes signed again with Águila for the Apertura 2018 tournament. In his return with Águila, Valoyes scored a goal in a 3–0 victory against Luis Ángel Firpo in the Estadio Juan Francisco Barraza, in November 2018.

In December 2018, Águila reached the semi-finals of the Apertura 2018, but they were defeated by Santa Tecla. In December 2018, Águila rescinded the Valoyes contract.

Sport Huancayo
On 29 November 2019, Valoyes joined Peruvian club, Sport Huancayo, for the 2020 season.

References

External links

1984 births
Living people
Colombian footballers
Colombian expatriate footballers
Cúcuta Deportivo footballers
Valledupar F.C. footballers
Atlético Balboa footballers
C.D. Dragón footballers
C.D. Águila footballers
Cortuluá footballers
Deportivo Pasto footballers
Sport Huancayo footballers
Categoría Primera A players
Peruvian Primera División players
Expatriate footballers in El Salvador
Expatriate footballers in Peru
Colombian expatriate sportspeople in El Salvador
Colombian expatriate sportspeople in Peru
Association football defenders